The 1917 Nobel Prize in Literature was equally divided between the Danish authors Karl Adolph Gjellerup (1857–1919) "for his varied and rich poetry, which is inspired by lofty ideals," and  Henrik Pontoppidan (1857–1943) "for his authentic descriptions of present-day life in Denmark." It is the second of four occasions when the Nobel Prize in Literature has been shared between two individuals.

Laureates

Karl Adolph Gjellerup

The son of a parson, Gjellerup studied theology, but after coming under the influence of Darwinism and the ideas of fellow countryman Georg Brandes, he thought of himself as an atheist. Later in life, he turned to religion once more and discovered inspiration for his writing in Buddhism. Gjellerup moved to Dresden in 1923. The subject of Karl Gjellerup's debut book, En idealist shildring af Epigonus ("An Idealist, A Description of Epigonus", 1878), was his personal conversion to atheism. In Minna (1889) and Der Pilger Kamanita ("The Pilgrim Kamanita", 1906), an exotic tale of reincarnation set in India, he displays his interest in Buddhism. Up until around 1900, Gjellerup wrote in Danish. Then, he switched to write exclusively in German, which he believed helped him grow as an artist. Das heiligste Tier ("The Holiest Animal", 1919) was his last work.

Henrik Pontoppidan

Like Gjellerup, Pontoppidan himself is also a son of a clergyman. He partly revolted against his religious environment by studying engineering in Copenhagen in 1873. Becoming a primary school teacher for a short time, he started writing full-time and became a freelance journalist, making his debut in 1881. Most facets of Danish life are covered in his novels and short stories. He wrote his three main works between 1890 and 1920: Det forjættede Land ("The Promised Land", 1891–95), Lykke-Per ("Lucky Per", 1898–1904) – the partially autobiographical story of a self-assured, extraordinarily bright guy, who defies his religious family to become an engineer, free of heritage and cultural context, and De dødes Rige ("The Realm of the Dead", 1912–16). He depicts Denmark in these works during the time of the constitutional conflict between conservatives and liberals, the growth of industrialization, and the emergence of revolutionary groups.

Deliberations

Nominations
In total, the Nobel Committee of the Swedish Academy received 26 nominations for 20 authors such as William Chapman, Arne Garborg, Carl Spitteler (awarded in 1919), Georg Brandes, Juhani Aho, and Àngel Guimerà. Most of the nominees were Scandinavian and six were newly nominated: Ivan Vazov, Otto Ernst, Jeppe Aakjær, Johan Bojer, and Bertel Gripenberg. Two female authors were nominated, the controversial Elisabeth Förster-Nietzsche and the Italian writer Grazia Deledda (awarded in 1926). The Swedish Academy's permanent secretary Erik Axel Karlfeldt received two nominations.

The authors Joseph Ashby-Sterry, Maksim Bahdanovič, Jane Barlow, Edmund Bishop, Léon Bloy, Oscar Blumenthal, Franz Brentano, Francis Cowley Burnand, William De Morgan, Mathilde-Marie de Peyrebrune, George Diamandy, Joaquín Dicenta, Émile Durkheim, António Feijó, Judith Gautier, Paul Hervieu, Agnes Leonard Hill, Emma Lili'uokalani, Katharine Sarah Macquoid, Titu Maiorescu, Octave Mirbeau, James Hope Moulton, Andrew Murray, José Enrique Rodó, and Mendele Mocher Sforim died without in 1917 without having been nominated for the prize.

Prize decision
In 1916, a shared prize between the Danish authors Jakob Knudsen and Karl Gjellerup had been considered by the Swedish Academy. Knudsen died in 1917, and Henrik Pontoppidan was awarded jointly with Gjellerup instead.

Reactions
The prize to Gjellerup and Pontoppidan was heavily criticised. In Denmark, the award to Gjellerup was particularly criticised as he was not writing in Danish but in German.

References

External links
Banquet speech by  Sven Söderman

1917